The Italian Catholic Archdiocese of Agrigento, in Sicily, was elevated to archiepiscopal status in 2000. The historic diocese of Agrigento was also known as the Diocese of Girgenti, and Diocese of Agrigentum. It used to be a suffragan of the archdiocese of Monreale.

History
Girgenti (the Greek Acragas, Roman Agrigentum) considers Saint Libertinus as its earliest proselytizer; he is said to have been sent by Saint Peter. Local enthusiasm for an Apostolic connection even led someone to forge a bull of investiture, an instrument which was not created for centuries.

Gregory of Agrigento, said to have been martyred in 262, never existed.  His name occurs in the hagiographical work, "The Life of St. Agrippina", but the author of that work, a person of the eighth or ninth century, placed the sixth century Bishop Gregory of Agrigento in the wrong context.

The earliest bishop of certain date is Potamius, who was believed to be a contemporary of Pope Agapetus I (535–36). Other scholars place him in the seventh century, in which case he would not be the earliest Bishop of Agrigento.

The succession of bishops, interrupted by the Saracen invasion (879–1038), began again in 1093 with Gerland of Agrigento.

Bishops

to 1300
...
Potamius ( ? )
Theodosius ( ? )
Gregorius ( ? )
Eusanius (attested 578 – 590)
Gregorius (attested 591 – 603)
Liberius
Felix
Hermogenes (c. 800)
...
Gerlandus (1093 – 1104)
Drago, O.S.B. (1104)
Guarinus, O.S.B. (1105 – after 1113)
Albertus (1118 – )
Gualterius (attested in 1127 – 17 April 1141)
Rogerius (elected in 1142)
Gentile (1154–1171)
Bartolomeo (1171 – 1191)
Urso (1191 – 1239)
Rinaldo di Acquaviva (1240 – c. 1264)
Godefredus Roncioni (1265? – 28 January 1271)
[Guillelmus Morini] (1271)
Guido (2 June 1273 – 1276)
Gobertus (1276 – 23 August 1286)
Sede Vacante (1286 – 1304)

1300 to 1500

Bertaldus de Labro (10 January 1304 – 27 March 1326)
Jacobus Muscus (1326)
Matteo Orsini, O.P. (20 Oct 1326 – 15 Jun 1327)
Philippus Hombaldi, O.P. (6 June 1328 – 1350)
Octavianus de Labro (12 May 1350 – 8 November 1362)
Matteo de Fugardo (16 March 1362 – after 1390)
Gilifortis Riccobono (6 March 1392 – 23 October 1395) (Roman Obedience) 
Petrus de Curtibus, O.E.S.A. (2 June 1393 – 1414?) (Avignon Obedience)
Nicolaus, O.S.B. (1395 – 3 June 1398) (Roman Obedience)
Nicolaus de Burelli (3 June 1398 – 1400) (Roman Obedience)
Giovanni Cardella (19 October 1400 – 1401) (Roman Obedience)
Giovanni de Pino, O.F.M. (1 October 1401 – ?) (Roman Obedience)
Philippus de Ferrario (4 July 1414 – ?) (Avignon Obedience)
Laurentius de Messasal, O.Cist. (16 March 1422 – 1442?)
Matteo da Gimara, O.F.M. (17 Sep 1442 – 1445 Resigned)
Antonio Ponticorona, O.P. (23 Jul 1445 – 1451 Died)
Domenico Xarth, O. Cist. (10 Jan 1452 – 1471 Died)
Giovanni de Cardellis (11 December 1472 – February 1479)
Juan de Castro (20 Mar 1479 – 29 Sep 1506 Died)

1500 to 1818

Giuliano Cibò (5 October 1506 – 1537)
Pietro Tagliavia d’Aragonia (28 May 1537 – 10 Oct 1544)
Cardinal Rodolfo Pio (10 Oct 1544 – 2 May 1564 Died) (Administrator)
Luigi Suppa, O.P. (13 Apr 1565 – 29 Sep 1569 Died)
Juan Battista de Ojeda (27 Aug 1571 – 1574 Died)
Cesare Marullo (14 Jul 1574 – 11 Sep 1577)
Juan Rojas (9 Oct 1577 – 21 May 1578 Died)
Antonio Lombardo (bishop) (30 Mar 1579 – 23 Jan 1585)
Diego Haëdo (23 Jan 1585 – 14 Aug 1589)
Francesco del Pozzo (1591 – 1593 Died)
Juan Orozco Covarrubias y Leiva (2 Dec 1594 – 16 Jan 1606)
Vincenzo Bonincontro, O.P. (25 Jun 1607 – May 1622 Died)
Ottavio Ridolfi (20 Mar 1623 – 6 Jul 1624 Died)
Francesco Traina (2 Mar 1627 – Oct 1651 Died)
Ferdinando Sanchez de Cuellar, O.S.A. (26 May 1653 – 4 Jan 1657)
Francesco Gisulfo e Osorio (30 Sep 1658 – Dec 1664 Died)
Ignazio d'Amico (15 Dec 1666 – 15 Dec 1668 Died)
Francesco Giuseppe Crespos de Escobar (2 May 1672 – 17 May 1674)
Francesco Maria Rini (Rhini), O.F.M. (19 Oct 1676 – 4 Aug 1696 Died)
Francesco Ramírez, O.P. (26 Aug 1697 – 27 Aug 1715 Died)
Anselmo de la Peña, O.S.B. (27 Sep 1723 – 4 Aug 1729)
Lorenzo Gioeni d'Aragona (11 Dec 1730 – Oct 1754 Died)
Andrea Lucchesi Palli (21 Jul 1755 – 4 Oct 1768 Died)
Antonio Lanza, C.R. (20 Nov 1769 – 24 May 1775 Died)
Antonio Branciforte Colonna (15 Apr 1776 – 31 Jul 1786 Died)
Antonino Cavalieri (15 Sep 1788 – 11 Dec 1792 Died)
Saverio Granata, C.R. (1 Jun 1795 – 29 Apr 1817)

since 1818
Baldassare Leone (2 Oct 1818 – 22 Jul 1820 Died)
Pietro Maria d'Agostino (17 Nov 1823 – 18 Jul 1835 Died)
Ignazio Giuseppe Nicola Epifanio Montemagno, O.F.M. Conv. (2 Oct 1837 – 21 Aug 1839 Died)
Domenico-Maria-Giuseppe Lo Jacono, C.R. (17 Jun 1844 – 24 Mar 1860 Died)
Domenico Turano (23 Feb 1872 – 2 Feb 1885 Died)
Gaetano Blandini (2 Feb 1885 – 19 May 1898 Died)
Bartolomeo Maria Lagumina (28 Nov 1898 – 5 May 1931 Died)
Giovanni Battista Peruzzo, C.P. (15 Jan 1932 – 20 Jul 1963 Died)
Giuseppe Petralia (14 Oct 1963 – 2 May 1980 Resigned)
Luigi Bommarito (2 May 1980 – 1 Jun 1988) Appointed, Archbishop of Catania
Carmelo Ferraro (3 Nov 1988 – 23 Feb 2008 Resigned)
Francesco Montenegro (23 Feb 2008 – 22 May 2021)
Alessandro Damiano (22 May 2021 – present)

Suffragan sees

Caltanissetta
Armerina

References

Additional sources

Reference Works
 (in Latin)
 (in Latin)

 pp. 946–947. (Use with caution; obsolete)
 (in Latin)
 (in Latin)
 (in Latin)

Studies

Kamp, Norbert (1975). Kirche und Monarchie im staufischen Königreich Sizilien: I. Prosopographische Grundlegung, Bistumer und Bischofe des Konigreichs 1194–1266: 3. Sizilien München: Wilhelm Fink 1975, pp. .

Agrigento
Agrigento
Agrigento